Mitterbach am Erlaufsee is a village in the district of Lilienfeld in the Austrian state of Lower Austria.

Population

References

Cities and towns in Lilienfeld District